Ab Sefid Ab Castle is a historical castle located in Kashan County in Isfahan Province, The longevity of this fortress dates back to the Safavid dynasty.

References 

Castles in Iran